The Woman God Changed is a 1921 American silent drama film directed by Robert G. Vignola and written by Brian Oswald Donn-Byrne and Doty Hobart. The film stars Seena Owen, E.K. Lincoln, Henry Sedley, Lillian Walker, H. Cooper Cliffe and Paul Nicholson. The film was released on July 3, 1921, by Paramount Pictures.

Cast 
Seena Owen as Anna Janssen
E.K. Lincoln as Thomas McCarthy
Henry Sedley as Alastair De Vries
Lillian Walker as Lilly
H. Cooper Cliffe as Donogan
Paul Nicholson as District Attorney
Joseph W. Smiley as Police Commissioner

Preservation status
The film is preserved minus a reel in the Library of Congress(Packard Campus for Audio-Visual Conservation) collection.

References

External links 

 
 

1921 films
1920s English-language films
Silent American drama films
1921 drama films
Paramount Pictures films
Films directed by Robert G. Vignola
American black-and-white films
American silent feature films
1920s American films